César Augusto Castro Paiva (born 24 April 1966 in Asunción, Paraguay) is an association football coach and former central defender. Castro played for most his career for Olimpia Asunción where he won several national and international championships such as the Copa Libertadores and Supercopa Sudamericana.

Honours
Olimpia Asunción
 Copa Libertadores: 1990
 Supercopa Sudamericana: 1990
 Recopa Sudamericana: 1990
 Paraguayan Primera División: 1993, 1995
 Torneo República: 1992

External links

Paraguayan footballers
Club Olimpia footballers
Paraguay international footballers
Paraguayan football managers
Living people
1966 births
Association football midfielders